The 1976 NHL Amateur Draft was the 14th NHL Entry Draft. It was held at the NHL office in Montreal, Quebec, on June 1, 1976. It's notable as featuring one of the weakest first rounds in draft history, as only two players (Rick Green and Bernie Federko) played more than 450 career NHL games.  In 2002, Federko was elected into the Hockey Hall-of-Fame after playing fourteen seasons (1976–1990), with 13 of those with the St. Louis Blues.  The Cleveland Barons drafted as the California Golden Seals and the Colorado Rockies took part as the Kansas City Scouts. The two franchises would relocate to their new cities on July 15 of that year.

The last active player in the NHL from this draft class was Kent Nilsson, who played his last NHL game in the 1994–95 season.

Selections by round
Below are listed the selections in the 1976 NHL amateur draft.

Club teams are located in North America unless otherwise noted.

Round one

 The Kansas City Scouts' first-round pick went to the Pittsburgh Penguins as the result of a trade on January 9, 1976 that sent Chuck Arnason, Steve Durbano and Pittsburgh's first-round pick in 1976 to Kansas City in exchange for Ed Gilbert, Simon Nolet and this pick.
 The Vancouver Canucks' first-round pick went to the Atlanta Flames as the result of a trade on January 20, 1976 that sent Curt Ridley to Vancouver in exchange for this pick.
 The Pittsburgh Penguins' first-round pick went to the Kansas City Scouts as the result of a trade on January 9, 1976 that sent Ed Gilbert, Simon Nolet and Kansas City's first-round pick in 1976 to Pittsburgh in exchange for Chuck Arnason, Steve Durbano and this pick.
 The Toronto Maple Leafs' first-round pick went to the Montreal Canadiens as the result of a trade on June 17, 1975 that sent  Wayne Thomas to Toronto in exchange for this pick.
 The Los Angeles Kings' first-round pick went to the Montreal Canadiens as the result of a trade on August 22, 1972 that sent Terry Harper to Los Angeles in exchange for Los Angeles' second-round pick in 1974, third-round pick in 1975 and this pick.
 The Buffalo Sabres' first-round pick went to the Washington Capitals as the result of a trade on January 22, 1976 that sent Bill Clement to Atlanta in exchange for Jean Lemieux, Gerry Meehan and this pick.
Atlanta previously acquired this pick as the result of a trade on October 1, 1975 that sent Jacques Richard to Buffalo in exchange for Larry Carriere and this pick.

Round two

 The Washington Capitals' second-round pick went to the Pittsburgh Penguins as the result of a trade on November 26, 1975 that sent Bob Paradise to Washington in exchange for this pick.
 The Kansas City Scouts' second-round pick went to the St. Louis Blues as the result of a trade on June 18, 1975 that sent Denis Dupere, Craig Patrick and cash to Kansas City in exchange for Lynn Powis and this pick.
 The Minnesota North Stars' second-round pick went to the Los Angeles Kings as the result of a trade on August 15, 1975 that sent  Tim Young to Minnesota in exchange for this pick.
 The Los Angeles Kings' second-round pick went to the Minnesota North Stars as the result of a trade on February 27, 1976 that sent Dennis Hextall to Detroit in exchange for Bill Hogaboam and this pick.
Detroit previously acquired this pick as the result of a trade on June 23, 1975 that sent Bart Crashley and Marcel Dionne to Los Angeles in exchange for Terry Harper, Dan Maloney and this pick.

Round three

 The Buffalo Sabres' third-round pick went to the Minnesota North Stars as the result of a trade on January 27, 1975 that sent Fred Stanfield to Buffalo in exchange for Norm Gratton and this pick.
 The Boston Bruins' third-round pick went to the Toronto Maple Leafs as the result of a trade on June 3, 1975 that sent Toronto's fourth-round pick in 1975 to Boston in exchange for this pick.

Round four

 The Kansas City Scouts' fourth-round pick went to the St. Louis Blues as the result of a trade on October 29, 1974 that sent Larry Giroux to Kansas City in exchange for Chris Evans and this pick.

Round five

 The St. Louis Blues' fifth-round pick went to the California Golden Seals as the result of a trade on March 9, 1976 that sent Dave Hrechkosy to St. Louis in exchange for a third-round pick in 1977 and this pick.

Round six

Round seven

Round eight

Round nine

Round ten

Round eleven

Round twelve

Round thirteen

Round fourteen

Round fifteen

Draftees based on nationality

See also
 1976–77 NHL season
 1976 WHA Amateur Draft
 List of NHL players

Notes

References
 2005 NHL Official Guide & Record Book

External links
 HockeyDraftCentral.com
 1976 NHL Amateur Draft player stats at The Internet Hockey Database

Draft
National Hockey League Entry Draft